The cinnamon-rumped seedeater (Sporophila torqueola) is a passerine bird in the typical seedeater genus Sporophila.

Taxonomy
This species is one of two resulting from the split of the former white-collared seedeater. The other former white-collared seedeater subspecies are now known as Morelet's seedeater. Genetic studies show that the cinnamon-rumped seedeater is more closely related to other Sporophila seedeaters than it is to Morelet's seedeater. There are two subspecies:
S. t. torqueola is found in southern Baja California and western Mexico.
S. t. atriceps is found in central and southwestern Mexico.

Distribution and habitat
The cinnamon-rumped seedeater is endemic to western Mexico. It mainly inhabits tropical and subtropical grasslands, savannas, and shrublands but can also be found in pastures, arable land, and heavily degraded former forests.

Foraging
The cinnamon-rumped seedeater eats mainly seeds and insects, and occasionally berries. It frequently forages on top of herbaceous plants, and less often on the ground.

References

Further reading

cinnamon-rumped seedeater
Endemic birds of Western Mexico
cinnamon-rumped seedeater
cinnamon-rumped seedeater